The British Mid-Heavyweight Championship was a top British wrestling championship found throughout the country's circuit. The title's history dates back to 1952 and runs to the present day. Officially mid-heavyweights were required to weigh between 14 st 2 lb and 14 st 12 lb (89.81 and 94.35 kg). The title was recognised as official by national TV network ITV for the purposes of their coverage of the UK wrestling scene and by its listings magazine TVTimes in accompanying magazine feature coverage.

Title history 
The title was founded in 1953 and remained active until 1981 when it was abandoned following the untimely death of incumbent champion Mike Marino. The title was revived in 2002 and his since become a regular feature on the British wrestling circuit.

Original title

Revived title
The title was revived in 2002 and has subsequently been defended outside the United Kingdom, an unusual occurrence for a British title.

See also

Professional wrestling in the United Kingdom

References

External links

Mid-Heavyweight wrestling championships
National professional wrestling championships
Professional wrestling in the United Kingdom